Comfort in Sound is the fourth studio album by Welsh rock band Feeder, released on 21 October 2002 and also the first to be released by the band after the suicide of drummer Jon Lee earlier in the year. The album was recorded at RAK Studios in London during most of 2002, and was produced by Gil Norton.

The band returned to live performance after Lee's suicide, playing low-key slots at various festivals in the United Kingdom, before releasing the single "Come Back Around" and then the album. Three further singles—"Just the Way I'm Feeling", "Forget About Tomorrow" and "Find the Colour"—followed the album's release. The album received positive reviews from the music press and was received well by the public, reaching number six on the UK Albums Chart. Although charting one place lower than predecessor Echo Park, Comfort in Sound had a much stronger chart run of 36 weeks on the weekly top 75 album chart, in comparison to the nine weeks of Echo Park. It is also one of the most successful albums of all time to be released in the United Kingdom as an independent album, spending a total of 90 non-consecutive weeks in the Top 50 of the U.K. Independent Albums Chart, with 47 of those also non-consecutive spent in the top 10. The album spent two weeks at No.1 on this listing.

Comfort in Sound is seen as a major commercial success, selling 506,127 units in the United Kingdom and giving the band their second top ten single, "Just the Way I'm Feeling". Inside the inlay, there were also a number of illustrations by Aya Takano, including a picture per song for four of these only, each with a lyrical extract. The first three of these were released as singles from the album, all in their order of appearance in the booklet, which led to beliefs that the fourth song "Comfort in Sound", would be the fourth single, only for "Find the Colour" to be released in its place instead.

In late 2016, Comfort in Sound was played in full on Kerrang! Radio, as part of a classic albums series. Later on in February 2017, the album was inducted into Virgin Radio's "Classic Albums Vault".

Release
The album was given a low-key promotional build up due to the death of drummer Jon Lee. Before the album's release, the band played a warm-up show at the Portsmouth Wedgewood rooms prior to performing at the Reading and Leeds festivals and at the Gig on the Green. Kerrang! magazine gave a rating of 5/5 (KKKKK), for the band's performance at Reading.  Part of the band's appearance on the main stage at the 2003 Glastonbury Festival was featured on BBC Three and the full set was broadcast on BBC Radio 1 later in the year.
The band went on to play an arena tour at the end of the year, with high ticket sales and selling out at the Bournemouth International Centre.

Lead single "Come Back Around" had its first airplay on BBC Radio 1's "The Evening Session" show, and was A-listed by the station. The song was originally recorded as an instrumental demo in 2001, with the lyrics shortly written afterwards. After Lee's suicide, Grant Nicholas re-wrote the lyrics to relate to their friend and colleague's death: when the final version was recorded with Mark Richardson on drums. A completely instrumental version of the album was issued to television and radio media.

Reception

The album was well received by critics and was a commercial success. It initially entered the charts at #6 before dropping out of the top 75 after only four weeks. It charted at #178 on the 2002 year-end charts, selling just under 100,000 units. In 2003, the release of "Just the Way I'm Feeling" sent the album back to #13 and helped it to #66 in the 2003 end of year charts. The album re-entered the album charts in early 2005: in total, it spent 36 weeks in the top 75. As of October 2016, it has sold over 506,000 copies.

"Just the Way I'm Feeling" gained over 15,000 UK radio plays and charted at #10 on the UK singles chart, with follow-up single "Come Back Around" reaching #14.

Accolades
 #5 in Rocksound’s 2002 albums list
 #37 in Q magazine's 2002 albums list
 #27 in Planet Sound's 2002 albums list (incorrectly listed as "Come Back Around")
 #32 in Kerrang! magazine's "Top 100 British Rock Albums of All Time"
 Rock Sound – "Album of the Month"
 Kerrang! – "Album of the Week"
 Metal Hammer – "Album of the Month"
 The Times – "Album of the Week"
 Virgin Radio – Classic Albums Vault inductee, February 2017

Award nomination
 "Best Album" at the 2003 Q Magazine Awards.

Track listing

Personnel

Feeder
Grant Nicholas – vocals, guitars, keyboards, production, additional arrangements
Taka Hirose – bass
Mark Richardson – drums, percussion

Additional musicians
Audrey Riley - string arrangements
Enrico Tomasso - trumpet on "Helium"
Charles Gillingham - accordion on "Quick Fade"
Matt Page - piano

Production
Gil Norton - production, additional arrangements
Adrian Bushby - engineering, mixing
Matt Sime - engineering, programming
Feeder - mixing
John Dunne - programming
Bob Ludwig - mastering
Aya Takano - artwork

Charts

Weekly charts

Year-end charts

References

2002 albums
Feeder albums
The Echo Label albums
Albums produced by Gil Norton